"Natural Environment Park" is the designation given by the Ontario Provincial Park System to parks which act as both recreational parks and Nature Reserves. They protect wildlife, while allowing camping and other recreational activities.

As of February 2008, the province lists 67 parks of this classification, including Algonquin Provincial Park, a park of 765,345 hectares.

See also 
List of Ontario Parks

References